William Hatch may refer to:
William Hatch (theologian) (William Henry Paine Hatch, 1875–1972), American theologian
William Hatch (bellfounder), 17th-century bellfounder in Kent, England
William H. Hatch (William Henry Hatch, 1833–1896), U.S. Representative from Missouri
William Hatch (New Hampshire politician), member of the New Hampshire House of Representatives
William Riley Hatch, American singer and actor